Palaeolycus (meaning "old wolf") is a genus of prehistoric fish.

References
http://paleodb.org/cgi-bin/bridge.pl?action=checkTaxonInfo&taxon_no=35574&is_real_user=1

Prehistoric aulopiformes